Statistics of Kuwaiti Premier League for the 2003–04 season.

Overview
It was contested by 14 teams, and Al Qadisiya Kuwait won the championship.

League standings

Places 5–8

Semifinals
Tadamon 1–2 : abd Al-Shabab
Kazma Sporting Club 4–1 : 1–2 Al Jahra

7th Place Match
Al Jahra 0–1 Tadamon

5th Place Match
Al-Shabab 1–2 Kazma Sporting Club

Places 1–4

Semifinals
Al Qadisiya Kuwait 3–0 : 0–1 Al Kuwait Kaifan
Al Arabi Kuwait 1–2 : 1–0 Al Salmiya Club

3rd Place Match
Al Kuwait Kaifan 1–3 Al Arabi Kuwait

Championship final
Al Qadisiya Kuwait 2–1Al Salmiya Club

References
Kuwait – List of final tables (RSSSF)

2003–04
1
2003–04 in Asian association football leagues